Dragoman was a historical title used by official interpreters in the Ottoman Empire and other Turkish, Arabic, and Persian-speaking polities.

Dragoman may also refer to:
 Dragoman, Bulgaria
 Dragoman Municipality, Bulgaria
 Dragoman Glacier, Antarctica
 Dragoman Marsh, the biggest natural karst wetland in Bulgaria
 Lucian Yahoo Dragoman, a Romanian child fraudulently claimed to have been named after web portal Yahoo!